Metodi Petrov Tomanov (born 29 July 1959) is a Bulgarian former international football player and current manager.

Career
His most successful period, while a player, was when he won three Bulgarian national championships and two national cups, all with CSKA Sofia. In that period he played four times for the Bulgarian national team. After leaving CSKA, he played few years more in Bulgaria before emigrating to Portugal and Yugoslavia, where he represented Atlético and Radnički Niš, respectively. He came to Radnički Niš after a spell with FK Timok. Soon after retiring, he began his coaching career.

Following his retirement as an active player, he began his coaching career after obtaining a UEFA A License.

Director career
On 15 March 2014 he became sport director of PFC Ludogorets Razgrad.

Honours
CSKA Sofia
3 times Bulgarian First League Champion: 1979-80, 1980-81 and 1981-82
2 times Bulgarian Cup winner: 1981 and 1985
1 time Cup Of the Soviet Army winner: 1985

References

External links
 
 

1956 births
Living people
Bulgarian footballers
Bulgaria international footballers
Bulgarian expatriate footballers
FC Hebar Pazardzhik players
PFC CSKA Sofia players
OFC Sliven 2000 players
PFC Spartak Pleven players
PFC Minyor Pernik players
FK Timok players
FK Radnički Niš players
First Professional Football League (Bulgaria) players
Yugoslav First League players
Expatriate footballers in Yugoslavia
Expatriate footballers in Serbia and Montenegro
Expatriate footballers in Portugal
Bulgarian expatriate sportspeople in Portugal
Bulgarian football managers
Association football midfielders
Bulgarian expatriate sportspeople in Yugoslavia
People from Pazardzhik Province